Rivière-sur-Tarn (Languedocien: Ribièira) is a commune in the Aveyron department in southern France.

The Château de Peyrelade is a ruined castle, open to visitors.

Population

See also
Communes of the Aveyron department

References

Communes of Aveyron
Aveyron communes articles needing translation from French Wikipedia